Harlan Joseph Marbley (October 11, 1943 in White Oak, Maryland – May 13, 2008) was a flyweight boxer from the United States who represented his native country at the 1968 Summer Olympics in Mexico City, Mexico. There he won the bronze medal, after a loss in the semifinals of the men's light flyweight division against eventual gold medalist Francisco Rodríguez from Venezuela.

Amateur career
Marbley won the 1968 National AAU Light flyweight championship.

1968 Olympic results 
Below is the record of Harlan Marbley, an American light flyweight boxer who competed at the 1968 Mexico City Olympics:

Round of 32: bye
Round of 16 Defeated Fuat Temel (Turkey) on points, 5-0
Quarterfinal: Defeated Gabriel Ogun (Nigeria) on points, 5-0	
Semifinal: Lost to Francisco Rodríguez (Venezuela) on points, 1-4 (was awarded bronze medal)

References
 
 

1943 births
2008 deaths
Sportspeople from Montgomery County, Maryland
People from White Oak, Maryland
Boxers at the 1967 Pan American Games
Boxers at the 1968 Summer Olympics
Boxers from Maryland
Flyweight boxers
Place of birth missing
Winners of the United States Championship for amateur boxers
Olympic bronze medalists for the United States in boxing
American male boxers
Medalists at the 1968 Summer Olympics
Pan American Games bronze medalists for the United States
Pan American Games medalists in boxing
Medalists at the 1967 Pan American Games